The list of shipwrecks in March 1828 includes some ships sunk, foundered, grounded, or otherwise lost during March 1828.

4 March

5 March

6 March

8 March

9 March

10 March

11 March

12 March

14 March

15 March

18 March

19 March

20 March

21 March

23 March

26 March

28 March

30 March

Unknown date

References

1828-03